Rasmussen's gecko (Urocotyledon rasmusseni) is a species of lizard in the family Gekkonidae. The species is endemic to the Udzungwa Mountains in Tanzania.

Etymology
The specific name, rasmusseni, is in honor of Danish herpetologist Jens Bødtker Rasmussen.

Reproduction
U. rasmusseni is oviparous.

References

Further reading
Bauer AM, Menegon M (2006). "A new species of prehensile-tailed gecko, Urocotyledon (Squamata: Gekkonidae), from the Udzungwa Mountains, Tanzania". African Journal of Herpetology 55: 13–22. (Urocotyledon rasmusseni, new species).
Spawls S, Howell K, Hinkel H, Menegon M (2018). Field Guide to East African Reptiles, Second Edition. London: Bloomsbury Natural History. 624 pp. . (Urocotyledon rasmusseni, p. 126).

Urocotyledon
Geckos of Africa
Reptiles of Tanzania
Endemic fauna of Tanzania
Reptiles described in 2006